Yakymenko is a Ukrainian surname. It is derived from the given name Yakym (Joachim). 

Notable people with the surname include:
 Aleksey Yakimenko (born 1983), Russian sabre fencer
 Oleksandr Yakymenko (disambiguation), multiple individuals
 Oleksandr Yakymenko, Ukrainian footballer
 Oleksandr Yakymenko, director of the Security Service of Ukraine
 Oleksandr Yakymenko, Chairman of the Supreme Court of Ukraine
 Oleksiy Yakymenko (born 1974), Ukrainian footballer

See also
 

Ukrainian-language surnames